Alex Campbell was a footballer who played in the English Football League for Clapton Orient. He was born in Glasgow, Scotland.

References

Year of birth missing
Year of death missing
Scottish footballers
Leyton Orient F.C. players
English Football League players
Parkhead F.C. players
Albion Rovers F.C. players
Association football defenders
Footballers from Glasgow